Strud is a hamlet of the village of Haltinne, Wallonia, located in the municipality of Gesves, province of Namur, Belgium.

The village church dates from the 11th century, and has a tower from the 9th century (with a 17th-century spire). It was expanded in 1891 and renovated in 1931.

References

External links

Populated places in Namur (province)